The 1992 San Jose State Spartans football team represented San Jose State University during the 1992 NCAA Division I-A football season as a member of the Big West Conference. The team was led by head coach Ron Turner, in his only year as head coach at San Jose State. They played home games at Spartan Stadium in San Jose, California. The Spartans finished the 1992 season with a record of seven wins and four losses (7–4, 4–2 Big West).

Schedule

Team players in the NFL
No San Jose State Spartans were selected in the 1993 NFL Draft.

Notes

References

San Jose State
San Jose State Spartans football seasons
San Jose State Spartans football